Nils Asheim (17 December 1895 – 26 August 1966) was a Norwegian politician for the Liberal Party.

He served as a deputy representative to the Norwegian Parliament from Oppland during the term 1945–1949.

References

1895 births
1966 deaths
Deputy members of the Storting
Oppland politicians
Liberal Party (Norway) politicians